The siege of Corfu in 1537 was led by the Ottoman Emperor Suleiman the Magnificent, against the Republic of Venice-held island of Corfu. It is part of the Ottoman–Venetian War (1537–1540), one of the numerous Ottoman–Venetian Wars of the period.

Avlona expedition
For 1537 important combined operations had been agreed upon between France and the Ottoman Empire as part of the Franco-Ottoman alliance, in which the Ottomans would attack southern Italy and Naples under Barbarossa, and Francis I would attack northern Italy with 50,000 men. Suleiman led an army of 300,000 from Constantinople to Albania, with the objective of transporting them to Italy with the fleet. The Ottoman fleet gathered in Avlona with 100 galleys, accompanied by the French ambassador Jean de La Forêt. They landed in Castro, Apulia by the end of July 1537, and departed two weeks later with many prisoners. Barbarossa had laid waste to the region around Otranto, carrying about 10,000 people into slavery. Francis however failed to meet his commitment, and instead attacked the Netherlands.

Siege
The Ottomans departed from Southern Italy, and instead diverted their forces to mount the Siege of Corfu, a possession of the Republic of Venice, in August 1537. Suleiman decided to leave Avlona for Corfu on 19 August 1537. The fleet, composed of about 320 ships, started bombarding Corfu on 26 August. Ottoman troops amounting to 25,000 men were landed on the island of Corfu.

At the siege, the Ottomans were met by the French Admiral Baron de Saint-Blancard, who had left Marseille on 15 August with 12 galleys, and arrived at Corfu in early September 1537. Saint-Blancard in vain attempted to convince the Ottomans to again raid the coasts of Apulia, Sicily, and the March of Ancona. Eventually Suleiman, worried by a plague among his troops, decided to return with his fleet to Istanbul by mid-September without having captured Corfu. 

French ambassador Jean de La Forêt became seriously ill and died around that time. Francis I finally penetrated into Italy, and reached Rivoli on 31 October 1537.

The fleet of Saint-Blancard wintered in Chios until 17 February 1538. It was decided that three ships would go to Constantinople, while the rest of the fleet returned to France. In Constantinople, they were received by the French ambassador Charles de Marillac. Hayreddin Barbarossa provided for the expenses, and the French galleys finally left on 11 April 1538 to return  to Nice through Monastir.

A consequence of the siege was that the Venetians decided to form an alliance with the Pope and the Habsburg against the Ottomans. On 18 June 1538, Francis I signed the Truce of Nice with Charles V, thereby temporarily abandoning the Franco-Ottoman alliance.

Notes

References
 Garnier, Edith L'Alliance Impie Editions du Felin, 2008, Paris  Interview

Corfu 1537
Conflicts in 1537
History of Corfu (city)
Suleiman the Magnificent
Corfu 1537
Corfu 1537
Military history of Greece
1537 in the Ottoman Empire
1537 in Europe
1537 in the Republic of Venice
Venetian rule in the Ionian Islands